Events in the year 1999 in Kazakhstan.

Incumbents
President: Nursultan Nazarbayev
Prime Minister: Nurlan Balgimbayev (1997–1999) and Kassym-Jomart Tokayev (1999–2002)

Events

January
 January 10 – Nursultan Nazarbayev was sworn in for another term following a victory in the presidential election.

February
 February 26 – The country adopted a treaty on a Common Economic Union.

October
 October 10 – The Fatherland party won the legislative election.

November
 November 5 – The Astana Zhas Ulan Republican School was founded.

References 

 
1990s in Kazakhstan
Years of the 20th century in Kazakhstan
Kazakhstan
Kazakhstan